Ernst Kals (2 August 1905 – 2 November 1979) was a Kapitän zur See with the Kriegsmarine during World War II. He commanded the Type IXC U-boat  on five patrols. He was awarded the Knight's Cross of the Iron Cross.

Career
Kals joined the Reichsmarine in 1924. In October 1940, after a period of service on torpedo boats and light cruisers, he transferred to the Ubootwaffe ("U-boat force"). He was awarded the Knight's Cross in September 1941.

In April 1942, Kals, in U-130, bombarded the Allied petroleum tank farm on Curaçao, in the Netherlands Antilles. He went on to sink a total of 20 ships on five patrols, for a total of 145,656 tons of Allied shipping.

In January 1943 Kals became commander of the 2nd U-boat Flotilla, based in Lorient, France. Promoted to Kapitän zur See in September 1944, he remained in this position until the end of the war.

Later life
Kals was held in French captivity from May 1945 to January 1948. He died at Emden in 1979 at the age of 74.

Awards
 Iron Cross (1939) 2nd Class (18 December 1939) & 1st Class (18 December 1941)
 U-boat War Badge (1939) (18 December 1941)
 Knight's Cross of the Iron Cross on 1 September 1942 as Korvettenkapitän and commander of U-130
 War Merit Cross 2nd Class with Swords (30 January 1944)

References

Notes

Bibliography

 
 
 

1905 births
1979 deaths
German prisoners of war in World War II held by France
U-boat commanders (Kriegsmarine)
Recipients of the Knight's Cross of the Iron Cross
Reichsmarine personnel
Military personnel from Saxony
People from Glauchau